The Shanta Creek Wildfire was a lightning caused forest fire that started on June 29, 2009 in the Kenai National Wildlife Refuge on the Kenai Peninsula of Alaska.

Background
During the late 1990s, the Kenai Peninsula was infested by spruce bark beetles. Many thousands of acres of spruce trees died as a result. Although the dead trees had subsequently been mostly removed from populated areas, there were still significant stands of dead trees in wilderness areas. Southcentral Alaska had been experiencing an unusually warm, dry summer that contributed to optimal conditions for a fire.
Initially, firefighting efforts were not made due to the fire being naturally caused and located in a wilderness area that had been designated a "limited fire suppression area." Black spruce forests have a life cycle of about 70 years, while white spruce have a cycle of 100 years or more. The initial fire area had not burned since 1871, and therefore the burn was seen as natural and beneficial.

Firefighting efforts

More resources were ordered to protect these areas. By June 11, over 400 persons were fighting the fire, and hotshot crews and bulldozers were utilized to create fire breaks. Air tankers and helicopters were also used to dump water and fire retardant near homes threatened by the fire. A temporary "tent city" was established at Skyview High School to house firefighters and support staff, and a no fly zone was established around the fire area. Smoke from the fire and others blazing simultaneously in Interior Alaska contributed to a visible haze of smoke over Anchorage and much of south-central Alaska. Fire managers began to take crews off the fire and reassign them after light but sustained rain fell on the fire for several days starting on July 18. By July 21, the fire had stopped expanding, and around 200 staff remained at the fire to monitor and conduct mop-up operations of remaining hot spots near populated areas.

Aftermath
On July 21, the fire was declared to be contained, and command and control were returned to the Refuge by federal fire managers. The overall cost of the firefighting effort was estimated at six million dollars. There were no deaths and no residences were burned.

See also

Mile 17 fire
2007 Caribou Hills fire
Funny River Fire
Swan Lake fire

References

 Official press releases from Fish and Wildlife Service

External links
 Official Kenai National Wildlife Refuge updates on the fire
 Map of the fire area (PDF format)

2009 in Alaska
2009 wildfires in the United States
Kenai Peninsula Borough, Alaska
Wildfires on the Kenai Peninsula
Fires in Alaska